The Golden Ibis Award is an accolade presented annually to recognize excellence of professionals in the film industry, including directors, actors, writers and composers. The award was established by Christophe Barratier and Sam Bambino in 2014. Historically given during the last quarter of the year at the La Baule Film Festival, the awards honor achievements for cinematic accomplishments for the preceding year.

The various category winners are awarded a copy of a statuette, which was created by artist Joëlle Bellet.

Categories
The Golden Ibis Award consists of seven merit awards for films from the previous year, as well as honorary awards for lifetime achievement.

Merit awards
Best Film
Best Screenplay
Best Actor 
Best Actress
Best Original Score
Best Short Film
Breakthrough Performance 

Special awards
Honorary Award
Tribute Award
Talent Award
Audience Award

References

External links

French film awards
Awards established in 2014
2014 establishments in France